Hassan Mehmani (born October 1, 1950 in Tehran) Iranian actor and director for film, television, and stage.

Education
After finishing high school, he studied in Acting and Stage Direction at University of Tehran Dramatic Arts School. He Also studied acting under Mostafa Oskooyi (Konstantin Stanislavski's 'system') at the Anahita studio.

Plays
 Rostam and Sohrāb by Abolqasem Ferdowsi directed by Mostafa Oskooyi 1970
 Tyalh by Mostafa Rahimi directed by Kahed Razan 1974
 The Mandrake by Niccolò Machiavelli directed by Abdul Hussian Fahim 1975
 Sound of fereydoun's footsteps  directed by Aladin Rahimi 1976
 Trial of Joan of Arc  directed by Rakonadin Khosravi 1976
 Haiti by W. E. B. Du Bois directed by Mostafa Oskooyi 1979
 Avicenna (Abu Ali ibn Sina) by Enayatolah Ehsani directed by Mostafa Oskooyi 1980
 Sousangerd directed by Mehdi Fat'hi 1981
 Milky Way (Kakeshane Rahe Shiri) by Karl Wittlinger directed by Reza Abdolalizade 1998
 Golden Tooth (Dandoon Tala) by Davoud MirBagheri directed by Fareed Sajadi Hoseyni 2002
 'Anovah (Anova) directed by Davood Daneshfar 2005
       Ward No. 6 by Anton Chekhov directed by Nasser Hosseini-Mehr 2009

Filmography
       Tohfeha directed by Ebrahim Vahidzade 1988
    Pakbakhteh  directed by Gholamhossein Lotfi 1994
 Vaghte chidan Gerdoha directed by Iraj Emami 2002
 Galogah 2010

Television series and Tele Theaters
 Pedar Salar (series) directed by Akbar Khajouei 1993 ( Big Hit television series)
 Mojasame Gatchi Roozegar Javani (series) by Asghar Farhadi and Akbar Mahlojian directed by Asghar Tavasooli 1998
 Barg Sabz 
 Darde sare Valedain''

References

External links
 /www.sourehcinema.com 
 https://www.youtube.com/watch?v=S-CQ7yBYSsY
 https://www.youtube.com/watch?v=OvUU1LHpyjw
 https://www.youtube.com/watch?v=7AlzVJcnXCg

Iranian male stage actors
Iranian male television actors
Iranian male film actors
Iranian film directors
University of Tehran alumni
People from Tehran
1950 births
Living people